The Boreas Railroad Station Site is a  site in Pike National Forest near Como, Colorado which was listed on the National Register of Historic Places in 1993.  The listed area spans the border of Park and Summit counties.

The site, at  elevation, is at Boreas Pass, which the Denver, South Park & Pacific Railroad narrow-gauge line crossed in 1893 by a "twisty route".

A post office operated there from 1896 to 1905.

The listing includes two contributing buildings and a contributing site.  The site is deemed significant for its potential to yield information.

References

Archaeological sites in Colorado		
National Register of Historic Places in Park County, Colorado
National Register of Historic Places in Summit County, Colorado
Buildings and structures completed in 1881